Actinonaias pectorosa is a species of freshwater mussel, an aquatic bivalve mollusk in the family Unionidae, the river mussels.

This species is endemic to the drainages of the Cumberland River and the Tennessee River in the United States.

References

 North Carolina Wildlife Resources Commission. Pheasantshell (Conrad, 1834).

Molluscs of the United States
Unionidae
Bivalves described in 1834
Taxa named by Timothy Abbott Conrad
Taxonomy articles created by Polbot